Devon Levi (born December 27, 2001) is a Canadian professional ice hockey goaltender for the  Buffalo Sabres of the National Hockey League (NHL). 

Levi was the MVP at the 2019 World Junior A Challenge. He was then the 2019–20 Canadian Junior Hockey League (CJHL) MVP and top goaltender, and the 2019–20 Central Canada Hockey League (CCHL) MVP and Top Goaltender. He was drafted 212th overall by the Florida Panthers in the seventh round of the 2020 NHL Entry Draft, and in 2021 his rights were traded to the Buffalo Sabres.

He played for the Canadian national junior ice hockey team at the 2021 World Junior Ice Hockey Championships. The team won the silver medal, and Levi ended the tournament with a .964 save percentage (SV%) (topping the all-time record established by Carey Price in 2007). He was named the tournament's Best Goaltender and to the tournament All Star Team. He was named to Team Canada in the 2022 Winter Olympics.

Early life
Levi is from Dollard-des-Ormeaux, a Montreal suburb. His father Laurent Levi is a software engineer, and his mother Eta Yacowar is an office administrator at the software company they are building. He has a younger brother, James. While Levi's first language is English, he also speaks French.

Levi, who is Jewish, attended Hebrew Foundation School. He then attended West Island College (2019), where he was a valedictorian. He took online courses from Athabasca University.

Playing career

Amateur
Levi began by playing street hockey with his father, and until he was 11 years old, his only experience in goal was on concrete.

He is noted by the media for his speed and technique.<ref></
 name="nhl.com"></ref> He is also noted by coaches for his ability to read the players and the game in front of him, and track the puck through traffic. During every timeout, he drops to his knees 15 feet in front of his net, bows his head, and uses breathing techniques to reset.

Quebec Midget AAA Hockey League
Levi played youth hockey for the Lac St-Louis Lions of the under-18 Quebec Midget AAA Hockey League in the Quebec Junior Hockey League (QMAAA) in 2016-19, beginning as their youngest player in his first season at 14 years of age. In 2018, he won the Montreal Amateur Athletic Association (MAAA) Governor's Award for Student Athlete of the Year, and the Daniel Brière Award for Best Hockey and Academic Achievement. In 2018 and 2019 he was chosen for the MAAA First All Star Team, and he was a two-time recipient of the Federation of Athletic Excellence of Quebec (FAEQ)/Montreal Canadiens' Foundation Award and Scholarship for Athletic and Academic Excellence (bursaries of $1,500).

In 2019, he set the record for most saves ever in a 60-minute Quebec Midget AA game, in a game in which he made 64 saves on 65 shots. In 2019 he also received the MAAA Ken Dryden Trophy as best goaltender prospect in the league and was awarded the Patrick Roy Trophy as the best defensive player in the playoffs. He holds the league record for career shutouts, with eight.

Central Canada Hockey League
Levi began his junior career in the Ottawa, Ontario, area with the Carleton Place Canadians in the Central Canada Hockey League (CCHL), a Junior A league, during the 2019–20 season. For the season, he had a .941 save percentage (SV%), and a 1.47 goals against average (GAA), with 8 shutouts (in 37 games), all leading the league.

He was named the 2019–20 Canadian Junior Hockey League (CJHL) Player of the Year, CJHL MVP, CJHL top rookie, and CJL top goaltender. He was also named the 2019–20 CCHL MVP, CCHL Top Goaltender, CCHL Rookie of the Year, CCHL Top Prospect, and a CCHL First Team All Star. Canadians' head coach Jason Clarke said: "If there is anyone who is going to take the NCAA by storm next year and really do some special things, I'd bet my mortgage on Devon Levi."

Draft and college
He was drafted 212th overall by the Florida Panthers in the seventh round of the 2020 NHL Entry Draft. On July 24, 2021, Levi's NHL rights, along with a 2022 first-round pick, were traded by the Panthers to the Buffalo Sabres in exchange for Sam Reinhart.

Levi committed to play in Boston for the NCAA Division I Northeastern University's Huskies men's ice hockey team, starting in the 2020–21 season. However, Levi did not begin his college career until the following season due to his lingering rib injury. Levi is majoring in computer science at Northeastern, which he is attending on scholarship. He was named to the Hockey East All-Academic Team for 2020–21.

He began his NCAA career, playing in the 2021–22 season for Northeastern, with back-to-back shutouts. In both October and November 2021, Levi was named Hockey East Pro Ambitions Rookie of the Month. By mid-season, he had set the Northeastern record for shutouts in a season.

At Northeastern University's victory in the 2023 Beanpot Tournament, Levi was awarded both the Eberly Award for being the goaltender with the highest save percentage and the Most Valuable Player award.

Professional

Buffalo Sabres
Having concluded his sophomore season with the Huskies, Levi ended his collegiate career by signing a three-year, entry-level contract with the Buffalo Sabres on March 17, 2023.

International play

 

Levi first attracted the attention of Hockey Canada through his stellar performance at the 2019 World Junior A Challenge, an under-20 tournament. He stopped 77 of 80 shots, led Canada East to a silver medal, and was named tournament MVP.

He gained more widespread recognition during the 2021 World Junior Ice Hockey Championships due to his outstanding play for the Canada men's national junior ice hockey team, helping them win the silver medal. Levi ended the tournament with a .964 SV% (topping the all-time record established by Carey Price in 2007) and a 0.75 GAA, both being the best in the tournament. He became the second goaltender ever to record three shutouts in the tournament. He was named the Best Goaltender of the tournament by the IIHF Directorate, and named to the tournament All-Star Team. After the World Juniors, Levi revealed that he had played the entire tournament with a fractured rib, after sustaining the injury against the German team in the opening game.

He was named to Team Canada in the 2022 Winter Olympics. Levi did not feature in any games in the 2022 Olympics, as Canada chose to play Matt Tomkins and Edward Pasquale.

Career statistics

Regular season and playoffs

International

Awards and honours

See also
 List of select Jewish ice hockey players

References

External links
 

2001 births
Living people
21st-century Canadian Jews
AHCA Division I men's ice hockey All-Americans
Athabasca University alumni
Canadian expatriate ice hockey players in the United States
Canadian ice hockey goaltenders
Florida Panthers draft picks
Ice hockey people from Quebec
Ice hockey players at the 2022 Winter Olympics
Jewish Canadian sportspeople
Jewish ice hockey players
Northeastern Huskies men's ice hockey players
Olympic ice hockey players of Canada
People from Dollard-des-Ormeaux